Morley's theorem may refer to:

 Morley's trisector theorem, a theorem in geometry, discovered by Frank Morley
 Morley's categoricity theorem, a theorem in model theory, discovered by Michael D. Morley